Purify may refer to:

 Purification (disambiguation), the act or process of purifying
 IBM Rational Purify, in computing, debugger software
 Maurice Purify (born 1986), American football wide receiver
 James & Bobby Purify, American soul music vocal duo
 Purify (album), a mini album released by the Canadian death metal band Axis of Advance in January 2006
 Purify (Funk Trek album), the second album by Omaha funk/jazz fusion band Funk Trek
 "Purify", a song by Metallica on the album St. Anger
 "Purify", a song by Neurosis on the album Through Silver in Blood
 "Purify", a song by Lacuna Coil on the album Unleashed Memories

See also
 Purified (disambiguation)
 Putrify